Liu Zhongshan (1929 – 22 February 2021) was a lieutenant general (zhongjiang) of the People's Liberation Army (PLA) who served as political commissioner of National University of Defense Technology between 1990 and 1994. He was a member of the 8th and 9th National Committee of the Chinese People's Political Consultative Conference.

Biography
Liu was born in Changtu County, Liaoning, 1929. He enlisted in the People's Liberation Army in September 1945, and joined the Chinese Communist Party (CCP) in March 1946. He was present at the Battle of Xiaoliangshan and Battle of Sanjiazi during the Chinese Civil War.

He became political commissioner of National University of Defense Technology in June 1990, and served until February 1994. He was promoted to the rank of major general (shaojiang) in September 1988 and lieutenant general (zhongjiang) in July 1993. On 22 February 2021, he died from an illness in Beijing, aged 92.

References

1929 births
2021 deaths
People from Tieling
People's Liberation Army generals from Liaoning
People's Republic of China politicians from Liaoning
Chinese Communist Party politicians from Liaoning
Members of the 8th Chinese People's Political Consultative Conference
Members of the 9th Chinese People's Political Consultative Conference